Crowell House may refer to several houses in the United States:

Alphabetical by state, then town
 Crowell House (Denver, Colorado), on the list of the oldest buildings in Colorado
 C. C. Crowell House, Somerville, Massachusetts, listed on the US National Register of Historic Places (NRHP)
 Crowell–Bourne Farm, West Falmouth, Massachusetts, NRHP-listed
 C.C. Crowell Jr. House, Blair, Nebraska, NRHP-listed
 Crowell House (Sea Cliff, New York), NRHP-listed
 J. B. Crowell and Son Brick Mould Mill Complex, Wallkill, New York, NRHP-listed
 Crowell House (Durham, North Carolina), NRHP-listed
 Warren-Crowell House, Terrell, Texas, NRHP-listed